() appears as a personification of the first weapon ever created according to Hindu epics. 'Asi' means 'sword'. A legend concerning Asi  appears in the Shanti Parva book of the Mahabharata. In Rigvedic Sanskrit Asi is still used as a term for a kind of sacrificial dagger or knife.

Legend
Out of curiosity Nakula, the fourth son of Pandu and the master of swordsmanship questioned the Kuru grandsire Bhishma on his arrow death bed as to which was the best weapon in all kinds of fighting. In his own personal views Nakula thought the sword to be the most superior since even on having lost one's bow, horse and the chariot, a skillful swordsman could still defend himself against the mace and spear wielders. Nakula further queried the grandsire about the origin and purpose of the Khadga as well as about its first acharya ("teacher, preceptor").

Gladdened by these intelligent queries by Nakula, Bhishma related to him the complete Itihasa (Sanskrit term for 'History') of the Khadga or "divine sword" starting from its creation down to the present.

Creation of Asi
The devas approached Brahma, the creator of the universe, in ancient time and protested against the unjust rule and evil doings of the demons (danavas).
Hearing the protest from the deities, Brahma collected sacrificial objects and proceeded to perform a grand sacrifice with the foremost of the rishis and devas at the side of Himalaya.

During the course of the sacrifice, a dreadful creature sprang from the midst of the sacrificial fires scattering flames all around. It was as though a moon had arisen in the midst of the stars. He was coloured like a deep-blue lotus. His teeth were sharp and terrible, stomach lean and skinny and stature very tall and slim. He was of exceeding energy and power. Simultaneously the earth started shaking, there were turmoils in the oceans, the forceful winds started howling all around, the trees started falling and being torn apart and the meteors started blazing through the skies, Brahma declared

Upon this, the creature assumed the form of a blazing sharp-edged sword, glowing like flames. This sword was the primordial weapon created by the deities for the destruction of evil. The name of the sword was Asi, the personification and the primary energy behind all weapons ever created. As per Bhishma, the constellation under which the sword was born is Krittika, Agni is its deity, Rohini is its Gotra, Rudra is its high preceptor and whoever holds this weapon obtains sure victory and have absolute power over any weapon ever created since asi is the primordial source of energy behind all weapons.

Succession of wielders of Asi
Brahma gave that sword to Shiva and requested him to put down the sinners and evil-doers and restore the Dharma (righteousness). Shiva assuming his terrible form, took up the sword and started the war against the Danava's, the enemies of the Deva's. The earth became miry with flesh and blood of daityas and he destroyed the entire community of daityas.

Shiva gave the sword to Vishnu. On course of time Vishnu gave it to Marichi, Marichi gave it to all the great rishis. The latter gave it to Vasava. Vasava gave it to the Regents of the world. The Regents gave that sword to Manu the son of Surya.  In time Manu installed his own son Kshupa in the sovereignty of all creatures and gave him the sword for their protection. From Kshupa it was taken by Ikshvaku and from Ikshvaku by Pururavas. From Pururavas it was taken by Ayus and from Ayus by Nahusha. From Nahusha it was taken by Yayati and from Yayati by Puru. From Puru it was taken by Amurtarya. From Amurtarya it descended to Bhumisaya. From Bhumisaya it was taken by Dushyanta's son Bharata. From Bharata it was taken by the righteous Ailavila. From Ailavila it was taken by king Dhundumara. From Dhundumara it was taken by Kamvoja, and from Kamvoja it was taken by Muchukunda, from Muchukunda it was taken by Marutta and from Marutta by Raivata. From Raivata it was taken by Yuvanashva and from Yuvanashva by Raghu. From Raghu it was taken by Harinashva. From Harinashva the sword was taken by Sunaka and from Sunaka by the righteous-souled Usinara. From the last it was taken by the Bhojas and the Yadus. From the Yadus it was taken by Sivi. From Sivi it descended to Pratardana of Kashi . From Pratardana it was received by Ashtaka and from Ashtaka by Prishadaswa. From Prishadaswa it was received by Bharadvaja and from Bharadvaja his son Drona obtained this weapon. Drona used this weapon in the famous Kurukshetra War described in the epic Mahabharata. Drona become unconquerable in Kurukshetra War because he held this primordial weapon.

After the death of Drona it was taken by Kripacharya. Kripacharya gifted this sword to Nakula and from Nakula it went to Parikshit and from Parikshit it went to Janamejaya. From Janamejaya it went to his son Satanika. Satanika, who studied the Vedas under Yajnyawalkya and military science from Kripacharya become dissatisfied with sensual enjoyments and obtained spiritual knowledge from the instructions of Saunaka and ultimately obtained salvation. The sword again went back to Kripacharya for safe keeping till the return of the rightful owner of this weapon, Dronacharya's son Ashwatthama.

See also
 Asigarh Fort

References

External links
Mahabharata Sword 
The Mahabharata: Book 11: The Book of Peace, Part 1, edited by James L Fitzgerald
Durga Puja, pp lviii–lix, Pratāpacandra Ghosha

Mahabharata
Weapons in Hindu mythology
South Asian swords
Indian swords
Mythological swords